Durango-Durango Emakumeen Saria is a women's bicycle race held in Spain. The race was organised as a 1.2 event from 2005 and 2019, and is now organised as a 1.1-categorised race.

Winners
Source:

References

External links

 
Recurring sporting events established in 2001
Cycle races in Spain
2001 establishments in Spain
Women's road bicycle races